Articles on War locomotive include:

 Kriegslokomotive, German war locomotive
 ROD 2-8-0, British war locomotive
 USATC S160 Class, U.S. war locomotive
 WD Austerity 2-8-0, British war locomotive
 WD Austerity 2-10-0, British war locomotive